Kyrnasivka is an urban-type settlement in Tulchyn Raion of Vinnytsia Oblast in Ukraine. It is located on the banks of the Kozarykha, in the drainage basin of the Southern Bug. Kyrnasivka belongs to Tulchyn urban hromada, one of the hromadas of Ukraine. Population:

Economy

Transportation
Kyrnasivka railway station is on the railway connecting Vapniarka with Haisyn and Khrystynivka. There is infrequent passenger traffic, both local and long-distance.

The settlement has road access to Tulchyn and Trostianets, where it has further connections to Vinnytsia, Odessa, and Uman.

References

Urban-type settlements in Tulchyn Raion